Valery Vladimirovich Anisimov (born 7 July 1937) is a retired Soviet heavyweight Greco-Roman wrestler. He won the Soviet title in 1963–1964 and a world title in 1965, placing second in 1966.

References

External links
 

1937 births
Living people
Sportspeople from Almaty
Soviet male sport wrestlers
Kazakhstani male sport wrestlers
World Wrestling Championships medalists